Six regiments of the British Army have been numbered the 97th Regiment of Foot:

97th Regiment of Foot (1760), raised in 1760
97th Regiment of Foot (1780), raised in 1780
97th Regiment of Foot (Inverness-shire Highlanders), raised in 1794
97th (Queen's Own Germans) Regiment of Foot, brought into the Army in 1804 and renumbered as the 96th in 1816
97th Regiment of Foot, raised as the 98th in 1804 and renumbered as the 97th in 1816
97th (The Earl of Ulster's) Regiment of Foot, raised in 1824